Guide County is a county in the east of Qinghai Province, China. It is under the administration of Hainan Tibetan Autonomous Prefecture. In Tibetan it's known as Trika. In 2015 it had a population of 108,800, of which 37.8% Tibetans, and 16.1% other ethnic minorities. In 2018 the population was 110,900.

It is located along the Yellow River, surrounded by hilly terrain on either side of the river valley.

Guide was first established during the Yuan dynasty. The area became part of Ming Dynasty China in 1370. In 1953 it was placed under jurisdiction of Hainan prefecture.

Guide old town 
The city's earthen walls and buildings were built between 1375 and 1380.  The city was enlarged in 1590.  After the founding of the People's Republic, the moats were filled in and the North and South gates were pulled down, as well as the towers.  In 2010 work commenced to restore the gates and towers.

Economics
Guide is known in Qinghai as a fruit producing county, in particular for pear cultivation, as it has a relatively mild climate. The Laxiwa Dam in Guide is the largest hydropower station on the upper reaches of the Yellow River.

Administrative divisions 
The county seat of Guide is in Heyin town. Guide governs over 4 towns and 3 townships:

Towns

 Heyin (河阴镇)
 Hexi (河西镇)
 Laxiwa (拉西瓦镇)
 Changmu (常牧镇)

Townships

 Hedong (河东乡)
 Xinjie Hui ethnic township (新街回族乡)
 Garang (尕让乡)

Climate

Transport 
The Guide General Aviation Airport started construction in 2018.

See also
 List of administrative divisions of Qinghai

References

External links

 

 
County-level divisions of Qinghai
Hainan Tibetan Autonomous Prefecture